This is a partial list of butterflies of São Tomé and Príncipe. More than 60 species are known from São Tomé and Príncipe, 19 of which are endemic.

Papilionidae

Papilioninae

Papilionini
Papilio nerminae Koçak, 1983 (endemic)
Papilio dardanus sulfurea Palisot de Beauvois, 1806
Papilio demodocus Esper, 1798

Leptocercini
Graphium angolanus baronis (Ungemach, 1932)
Graphium ridleyanus (White, 1843)
Graphium leonidas leonidas (Fabricius, 1793)
Graphium leonidas santamarthae (Joicey & Talbot, 1927)
Graphium leonidas thomasius (Le Cerf, 1924)
Graphium latreillianus theorini (Aurivillius, 1881)

Pieridae

Coliadinae
Catopsilia florella (Fabricius, 1775)

Pierinae

Pierini
Leptosia nupta (Butler, 1873)
Mylothris nubila (Möschler, 1884)
Mylothris rembina (Plötz, 1880)
Dixeia piscicollis Pinhey, 1972 (endemic)

Lycaenidae

Poritiinae
Liptena evanescens (Kirby, 1887)

Theclinae
Iolaus bellina maris (Riley, 1928)
Deudorix caliginosa Lathy, 1903
Deudorix chalybeata Joicey & Talbot, 1926 (endemic)
Deudorix lorisona (Hewitson, 1862)

Polyommatinae
Euchrysops malathana (Boisduval, 1833)
Lampides boeticus (Linnaeus, 1767)
Leptotes pirithous (Linnaeus, 1767)
Leptotes sanctithomae (Sharpe, 1893) (endemic)
Zizeeria knysna (Trimen, 1862)

Nymphalidae

Libytheinae
Libythea labdaca Westwood, 1851

Danainae

Danaini
Danaus chrysippus Linnaeus, 1758

Satyrinae

Melanitini
Melanitis leda (Linnaeus, 1758)

Satyrini
Bicyclus dorothea concolor Condamin & Fox, 1964
Bicyclus medontias (Hewitson, 1873)

Charaxinae

Charaxini
Charaxes defulvata Joicey & Talbot, 1926 (endemic)
Charaxes thomasius Staudinger, 1886 (endemic)
Charaxes lemosi Joicey & Talbot, 1927 (endemic)
Charaxes odysseus Staudinger, 1892 (endemic)
Charaxes antiquus Joicey & Talbot, 1926 (endemic)
Charaxes barnsi Joicey & Talbot, 1927 (endemic)
Charaxes monteiri Staudinger, 1886 (endemic)

Nymphalinae

Nymphalini
Junonia cymodoce lugens (Schultze, 1912)
Precis sinuata Plötz, 1880
Hypolimnas misippus Linnaeus, 1764
Hypolimnas anthedon Doubleday, 1845
Hypolimnas salmacis thomensis Aurivillius, 1910

Cyrestinae

Cyrestini
Cyrestis camillus (Fabricius, 1781)

Biblidinae

Epicaliini
Sevenia boisduvali insularis (Joicey & Talbot, 1926)

Limenitinae

Limenitidini
Pseudacraea lucretia gamae Joicey & Talbot, 1927

Neptidini
Neptis eltringhami Joicey & Talbot, 1926 (endemic)
Neptis larseni Wojtusiak & Pyrcz, 1997 (endemic)

Heliconiinae

Acraeini
Acraea annobona d'Abrera, 1980
Acraea medea (Cramer, 1775) (endemic)
Acraea niobe Sharpe, 1893 (endemic)
Acraea alcinoe racaji (Pyrcz, 1991)
Acraea insularis Sharpe, 1893 (endemic)
Acraea jodutta (Fabricius, 1793)
Acraea newtoni Sharpe, 1893 (endemic)
Acraea neobule Doubleday, 1847

Hesperiidae

Coeliadinae
Coeliades bocagii (Sharpe, 1893) (endemic)
Coeliades hanno (Plötz, 1879)

Hesperiinae

Aeromachini
Andronymus neander thomasi Riley, 1928

Baorini
Borbo fatuellus thomea (Evans, 1937)
Borbo perobscura (Druce, 1912)

See also
List of moths of São Tomé and Príncipe
Wildlife of São Tomé and Príncipe

References

Seitz, A. Die Gross-Schmetterlinge der Erde 13: Die Afrikanischen Tagfalter. Plates
Seitz, A. Die Gross-Schmetterlinge der Erde 13: Die Afrikanischen Tagfalter. Text 
Luis F. Mendes & Bivar de Sousa, New account on the butterflies (Lepidoptera:Rhopalocera) of São Tomé e Príncipe, Boletín de la Sociedad Entomológica Aragonesa (S.E.A.), 51 (31/12/2012): 157‒186.

 B

São Tomé and Príncipe
São Tomé and Príncipe
Butterflies